Spirito is the sixth studio album from Italian rock band Litfiba. 
It is the third chapter of the "Tetralogy of elements". It is dedicated to air.

Track listing
Lo spettacolo  – 4:10
Animale di zona  – 4:36
Spirito  – 4:41
La musica fa  – 5:12
Tammùria  – 4:10
Lacio drom (Buon viaggio)  – 4:12
No frontiere  – 5:15
Diavolo illuso  – 4:27
Telephone blues  – 1:03
Ora d'aria  – 5:07
Suona fratello  – 2:10

Personnel
Piero Pelù - Vocals
Daniele Bagni - Bass
Ghigo Renzulli - Guitars
Antonio Aiazzi - Keyboards, Marimba
Franco Caforio - Drums
Candelo Cabezas – Percussions

Produced by Rick Parashar and Litfiba

Litfiba albums
EMI Records albums
1994 albums
Albums produced by Rick Parashar
Italian-language albums